The Government Director of Personnel is a Norwegian position in the civil service.

The director leads the Department of Employer Policy within the Norwegian Ministry of Government Administration, Reform and Church Affairs. According to the Public Service Disputes Act the sitting director is also a member of the National Wages Board.

The Department of Employer Policy was formerly organized as a directorate, the State Directorate of Personnel.

List of Government Directors of Personnel
As directors of the State Directorate of Personnel:
1945–1948 : Henrik Lundh
1948–1974 : Bjarne Døhlen
1974–1990 : Nils Mugaas
As leaders of the Department of Employer Policy:
1990–1995 : Aud Blankholm
1995–2003 : Per Engebretsen
2002 : Finn Melbø, while Engebretsen was acting director of Aetat
2003–2004 : Per Kristian Knutsen (acting)
2004–2008 : Jørn Skille
2008–2012 : Siri Røine
2012–2015 : Merethe Foss Liverud
2015– : Gisle Norheim

References

Government of Norway